list of football clubs based in Singapore.

Football clubs

1
 1 Tanah Merah Latini FC

A
 Admiralty CSC
 Admiralty FC
 Admiralty Rangers FC
 Aioli Monkeys FC
 Albirex Niigata Singapore FC
 Andrew's Avenue FC
 Ang Mo Kio United FC

B
 Balestier Khalsa FC
  Balestier United RC
 Bedok South Avenue SC
 Belgian and Luxembourg Association of Singapore
 British Club Singapore
 Bishan Barx FC
 Boon Keng SRC
 Bukit Timah FC
 Borussia Zamrud FC

C
 Cairnhill FC
 Casual FC Singapore
 CBD Wanderers	
 Commonwealth Cosmos FC

D
 DPMM FC
Dunearn United FC
 DARKHORSE FC

E
 Étoile FC
 ESPZEN Soccer School
 Eunos Crescent FC
 Euro Soccer Academy Singapore

G
 Gaelic Lions FC
 German-Swiss All Stars FC
 Geylang International FC
 Geylang Serai FC
 GFA Sporting Westlake FC
 GFA Victoria FC
 Gombak United FC
 Gymkhana FC

H
 Hibernians Singapore FC
 Hougang United FC
 Hollandse FC

I

J
 J-Heat FC
 Jalan Kayu CSC
 JSSL Singapore
 Jungfrau Punggol FC

K
 Kaki Bukit SC
 Kallang Sportif Huskies FC
  Katong FC
 Kembangan United FC

L
 Lion City Sailors F.C.

M
 Mountbatten FC

N

O
  Olympique Gaulois FC
 Ottawa Serpent FC

P
 Philippine FC Singapore
 Police SA
 Prison SRC
 Project Vault Oxley SC

R
  Redhill Rangers FC
 Republic FC

S
 St Michael's Soccer Association
 Siglap FC
 Simei United FC
  Singapore Armed Forces Sports Association
 Singapore Cricket Club
 Singapore Football Club
  Singapore Khalsa Association
 Singapore Recreation Club
 Singapore Vikings FC
 Starlight Soccerites FC
ASC Serangoon
 Stable Boys FC

T
 Tampines Rovers FC
 Tampines Rovers SC
 Tanjong Pagar United FC
  Tiong Bahru
 TGA Rangers FC
 Turf City FC

U

V
 Vietnam FC

W
 Warriors FC
 Woodlands Lion FC
 Woodlands Warriors FC
 Woodlands Wellington FC

Y
 Yishun FC
 Yishun Sentek Mariners FC
  Young Lions

Z

This is a list of football clubs in Singapore.

Singapore Premier League Clubs
  Albirex Niigata (S) 
 Balestier Khalsa
  DPMM FC
 Geylang International 
 Lion City Sailors FC
 Hougang United 
 Warriors FC 
 Tampines Rovers
 Tanjong Pagar United
  Young Lions

Singapore Football League Clubs

The Singapore Football League, commonly known as the SFL, is a semi-professional competition for clubs that are affiliated to the Football Association of Singapore. It makes up the second and third tier of football in Singapore after the SPL and before the Singapore Island Wide League.

Active SFL Teams

 Admiralty CSC
 Admiralty FC
 Balestier United RC
 Bishan Barx FC
 Commonwealth Cosmos FC
 Eunos Crescent FC
 Jungfrau Punggol FC

 Kaki Bukit SC
 Katong FC
 Police SA
 Project Vault Oxley SC
 SAFSA
 Siglap FC

 Singapore Cricket Club
 Singapore Khalsa Association
 South Avenue SC
 Starlight Soccerites FC
 Tiong Bahru FC
 Warwick Knights FC
 Yishun Sentek Mariners FC

Singapore Island Wide League Clubs 

The Island Wide League is a semi-professional tournament which made up the 4th tier of the Singapore football league system. It is a SFL qualification tournament whereby the top 2 team of the tournament get an automatic qualification into SFL the following season.

Active IWL Clubs

 Admiralty Rangers FC
 Bedok South Avenue
 Boon Keng SRC
 Bukit Timah Juniors  
 GDT Circuit FC
 Geylang Serai FC
 Kallang Sportif Huskies FC
 Kembangan United FC
 Prison SRC
 Simei United FC
 Winchester Isla FC
 Yishun FC

Futsal/5-a-side Clubs

Atlético de Madrid Singapore lions
Azzurri FC
Arsenal SG
CP FOOTBALL
Knockout FC
FC CERTIS RANGERS
Fifty34 United Football Club
Kachang Puteh
Opera United
SEFC
Happy Family Futsal Team
Republic Sports Association Futsal
Joga bonito
KAKIBALLERZ
Singapore Disability Sports Council
Russla's Hustlers
Sunrise FC
Gaelic Lions Balotelitubbies
Torpedo Rovers
Hibernians Futsal Club
Ronaldinho 10 FT
Paris-Saint Germain Singapore Fan Club
Olympique de Marseille Fan Club
Manchester City FC Supporters Club Singapore
SG Santos Futebol

Former Clubs

Former S.League clubs
 Balestier Central (Merged with Clementi Khalsa to form Balestier Khalsa)
 Clementi Khalsa (Merged with Balestier Central to form Balestier Khalsa)
 Gombak United (Withdrew due to financial reason)
 Jurong FC (Withdrew due to financial reason)
 Paya Lebar Punggol (Merged with Sengkang Marine to form Sengkang Punggol)
 Sembawang Rangers (Withdrew due to financial reason)
 Sengkang Marine (Merged with Paya Lebar Punggol to form Sengkang Punggol)
 Sengkang Punggol (Now Hougang United)
 Woodlands Wellington (merged with Hougang United)

  Beijing Guoan Talent
  Dalian Shide
  Liaoning Guangyuan
  Sinchi FC
  Harimau Muda A
  Harimau Muda B
  Super Reds
  Sporting Afrique (Foreign team made up of players from Africa)

FAS Premier League (1988–1995)
Balestier United RC
 Darwin Cubs (foreign team from Australia)
Geylang International FC 
Jurong Town FC
 Perth Kangaroos IFC (foreign team from Australia)
Police Sports Association (now Home United, while current PSA plays in NFL Division 1)
Singapore Armed Forces Sports Association (now Warriors FC, while current SAFSA plays in NFL Division 1)
Singapore National Team (played in the Premier League for one year in 1995, following Singapore's withdrawal from the Malaysia League)
Tampines Rovers FC
Tiong Bahru CSC

Former SFL Clubs

 Ang Mo Kio United FC
 Elias Park FC
 Gambas Avenue FC

 GFA Sporting Westlake FC
 GFA Victoria FC
Gymkhana FC
 Mountbatten FC
 Newton Heath FC 

 Redhill Rangers FC
 Singapore Recreation Club

External links

See also
Football Association of Singapore
S.League
Singapore Cup
Singapore Community Shield
Singapore National Football League
Singapore League Cup
Singapore FA Cup

References

Singapore
 
Football clubs
Football clubs